The 1987 Chicago Cubs season was the 116th season of the Chicago Cubs franchise, the 112th in the National League and the 72nd at Wrigley Field. The Cubs finished sixth and last in the National League East with a record of 76–85, 18½ games behind the division and pennant-winning St. Louis Cardinals.

Offseason

Spring training 
The team opened camp in Mesa, Arizona, apparently content with Brian Dayett to start in right field. However, Andre Dawson and his agent Dick Moss showed up after camp opened hoping that Green would consider signing the all-star outfielder. Dawson was one of the top free agents on the market during the off-season, but he garnered little interest. He made no secret that he wanted to leave Montreal, where his knees were battered by the Olympic Stadium Astroturf. He also made it known during the off season that the Cubs were his top choice, as Wrigley Field had a natural grass surface and had no lights. Dawson hit considerably better during the day.

After a couple weeks of Green saying he was flatly uninterested in Dawson, Dawson and Moss presented Green with a "blank" signed contract. Green filled in the amount -- $500,000 for one year.

Spring training also began with the dark news of broadcaster Harry Caray suffering a stroke in Palm Springs. WGN announced that until Caray was well enough to return, guest announcers would fill in and sit alongside color analyst Steve Stone.

Notable transactions 
 December 9, 1986: Heathcliff Slocumb was drafted by the Cubs from the New York Mets in the 1986 minor league draft.
 February 17, 1987: Guy Hoffman was traded by the Cubs to the Cincinnati Reds for Wade Rowdon.
 March 9, 1987: Andre Dawson was signed as a free agent by the Cubs.
 March 23, 1987: Mike Martin was released by the Cubs.
 March 30, 1987: Thad Bosley and Dave Gumpert were traded by the Cubs to the Kansas City Royals for Jim Sundberg.

Regular season
The 1987 season featured a career year from free-agent acquisition Andre Dawson, who captured National League Most Valuable Player honors following a 49-home run season. It was also the rookie season for starting pitcher Greg Maddux, the final full season for Wrigley Field without lights, and the last year for general manager Dallas Green, who resigned in late October 1987.

Season summary
An 18–10 May propelled the Cubs into the race, and they spent time in first place in early June. However, injuries to Ryne Sandberg and Shawon Dunston within days of each other crippled the Cubs' middle infield and hampered their offense. Their replacements were Paul Noce and Mike Brumley, respectively, Brumley having been acquired as "thrown-in" in the 1984 Buckner-for-Eckersley trade. Neither player was able to come close to replacing the lost production from Sandberg and Dunston and, consequentially, the team struggled.

In the month of August, two incidents occurred in which players cheated against the Cubs. Phillies pitcher Kevin Gross was pitching against the Chicago Cubs on Aug 10, 1987. Gross was caught with sandpaper in his glove and suspended for 10 games. Astros batter Billy Hatcher was batting against the Chicago Cubs on Aug 31, 1987, when he broke his bat and it flew down the third base line. Cubs third baseman Keith Moreland saw cork, and Hatcher was suspended for 10 games. Later on, Hatcher claimed that he was using pitcher Dave Smith's bat, and not his own.

After a woeful August, Michael told the press that he was planning on resigning after the season. Green said that he would accept the resignation, effective immediately, and replaced Michael with Frank Lucchesi, a longtime scout in the Philadelphia organization who had become a Cubs roving instructor. As the Cubs played out the string under Lucchesi, they finished last, although they were a markedly improved team over the '86 club, with a promising future.

Season standings

Record vs. opponents

Notable transactions
 April 6, 1987: Dickie Noles was signed as a free agent by the Cubs.
 July 13, 1987: Steve Trout was traded by the Cubs to the New York Yankees for Bob Tewksbury, Rich Scheid, and Dean Wilkins.
 September 22, 1987: Dickie Noles was loaned by the Cubs to the Detroit Tigers.

Opening Day starters
 Jody Davis
 Andre Dawson
 Brian Dayett
 Bob Dernier
 Shawon Dunston
 Leon Durham
 Keith Moreland
 Ryne Sandberg
 Rick Sutcliffe

Roster

Game log

|- align="center" bgcolor="ffbbbb"
|1||April 7|| Cardinals||9 – 3 ||Tudor (1-0)||Sutcliffe (0-1)||Dawley (1)|| 38,240 ||0-1||
|- align="center" bgcolor="ffbbbb"
|2||April 9|| Cardinals||4 – 2 ||Cox (1-0)||Trout (0-1)||Worrell (1)|| 12,441 ||0-2||
|- align="center" bgcolor="bbffbb"
|3||April 10||@ Phillies||4 – 3 ||Lynch (1-0)||K. Gross (0-1)||Noles (1)|| 43,212 ||1-2||
|- align="center" bgcolor="bbffbb"
|4||April 11||@ Phillies||9 – 1 ||Sutcliffe (1-1)||Cowley (0-1)|||| 21,581 ||2-2||
|- align="center" bgcolor="ffbbbb"
|5||April 12||@ Phillies||9 – 8 10||Bedrosian (1-0)||Smith (0-1)|||| 23,769 ||2-3||
|- align="center" bgcolor="bbffbb"
|6||April 13||@ Phillies||5 – 2 ||Moyer (1-0)||Carman (0-1)||Smith (1)|| 15,366 ||3-3||
|- align="center" bgcolor="ffbbbb"
|7||April 15|| Pirates||3 – 1 10||D. Robinson (2-0)||Noles (0-1)|||| 5,369 ||3-4||Pat Summerall broadcasts.
|- align="center" bgcolor="ffbbbb"
|8||April 16|| Pirates||6 – 0 ||Kipper (1-1)||Lynch (1-1)|||| 6,956 ||3-5||
|- align="center" bgcolor="bbffbb"
|9||April 17|| Expos||7 – 0 ||Sutcliffe (2-1)||Youmans (0-2)|||| 23,023 ||4-5||Bill Murray announces the game on WGN-TV
|- align="center" bgcolor="ffbbbb"
|10||April 18|| Expos||4 – 2 ||Sebra (1-1)||Maddux (0-1)||St. Claire (2)|| 32,613 ||4-6||
|- align="center" bgcolor="ffbbbb"
|11||April 19|| Expos||3 – 1 ||Sorensen (1-0)||Moyer (1-1)||McGaffigan (1)|| 19,889 ||4-7||
|- align="center" bgcolor="bbffbb"
|12||April 21||@ Cardinals||5 – 4 ||Noles (1-1)||Dawley (0-1)||Smith (2)|| 26,333 ||5-7||
|- align="center" bgcolor="bbffbb"
|13||April 22||@ Cardinals||5 – 4 ||Sutcliffe (3-1)||Dawley (0-2)||Smith (3)|| 23,784 ||6-7||
|- align="center" bgcolor="ffbbbb"
|14||April 23||@ Cardinals||5 – 2 ||Cox (3-0)||Maddux (0-2)|||| 29,347 ||6-8||
|- align="center" bgcolor="bbffbb"
|15||April 24||@ Expos||6 – 4 ||Moyer (2-1)||Sebra (1-2)||Smith (4)|| 7,752 ||7-8||
|- align="center" bgcolor="bbffbb"
|16||April 25||@ Expos||9 – 4 ||Sanderson (1-0)||Tibbs (1-3)|||| 11,824 ||8-8||
|- align="center" bgcolor="bbffbb"
|17||April 26||@ Expos||7 – 1 ||Trout (1-1)||Sorensen (1-1)|||| 12,052 ||9-8||
|- align="center" bgcolor="ffbbbb"
|18||April 28|| Giants||6 – 2 ||Krukow (1-3)||Sutcliffe (3-2)|||| 10,097 ||9-9||
|- align="center" bgcolor="bbffbb"
|19||April 29|| Giants||8 – 4 ||Maddux (1-2)||Mason (1-1)||Lynch (1)|| 11,120 ||10-9||Dawson hits for cycle
|- align="center" bgcolor="ffbbbb"
|20||April 30|| Giants||5 – 4 ||Garrelts (3-2)||Smith (0-2)||Minton (1)|| 11,934 ||10-10||
|-

|- align="center" bgcolor="bbffbb"
|21||May 1|| Padres||7 – 5 ||DiPino (1-0)||McCullers (2-3)||Smith (5)|| 16,100 ||11-10||
|- align="center" bgcolor="bbffbb"
|22||May 2|| Padres||7 – 3 ||Trout (2-1)||Whitson (3-3)||Lynch (2)|| 25,428 ||12-10||
|- align="center" bgcolor="bbffbb"
|23||May 3|| Padres||4 – 2 ||Sutcliffe (4-2)||Hawkins (0-3)||Smith (6)|| 27,202 ||13-10||
|- align="center" bgcolor="bbffbb"
|24||May 4|| Dodgers||5 – 4 ||Noles (2-1)||Howell (2-1)|||| 17,487 ||14-10||
|- align="center" bgcolor="ffbbbb"
|25||May 5|| Dodgers||3 – 1 ||Welch (4-1)||Moyer (2-2)|||| 18,021 ||14-11||
|- align="center" bgcolor="bbffbb"
|26||May 6||@ Giants||9 – 4 ||Sanderson (2-0)||M. Davis (3-2)||Smith (7)|| 15,123 ||15-11||
|- align="center" bgcolor="ffbbbb"
|27||May 7||@ Giants||11 – 1 ||LaCoss (3-1)||Lynch (1-2)||J. Robinson (6)|| 12,228 ||15-12||
|- align="center" bgcolor="bbffbb"
|28||May 8||@ Padres||6 – 3 ||Sutcliffe (5-2)||S. Davis (1-5)||Smith (8)|| 46,533 ||16-12||
|- align="center" bgcolor="bbffbb"
|29||May 9||@ Padres||5 – 2 ||Maddux (2-2)||Show (1-3)||Smith (9)|| 19,088 ||17-12||
|- align="center" bgcolor="ffbbbb"
|30||May 10||@ Padres||14 – 2 ||Whitson (4-4)||Moyer (2-3)||Booker (1)|| 14,682 ||17-13||
|- align="center" bgcolor="bbffbb"
|31||May 11||@ Dodgers||6 – 3 ||Sanderson (3-0)||Hershiser (3-4)||Smith (10)|| 35,819 ||18-13||
|- align="center" bgcolor="ffbbbb"
|32||May 12||@ Dodgers||7 – 0 ||Honeycutt (2-1)||Lynch (1-3)|||| 41,216 ||18-14||
|- align="center" bgcolor="bbffbb"
|33||May 13||@ Dodgers||5 – 0 ||Sutcliffe (6-2)||Pena (0-3)|||| 39,294 ||19-14||
|- align="center" bgcolor="bbffbb"
|34||May 15||@ Astros||3 – 1 ||Maddux (3-2)||Darwin (2-3)||Smith (11)|| 23,471 ||20-14||
|- align="center" bgcolor="bbffbb"
|35||May 16||@ Astros||2 – 1 ||Moyer (3-3)||Ryan (2-3)||DiPino (1)|| 34,921 ||21-14||
|- align="center" bgcolor="bbffbb"
|36||May 17||@ Astros||6 – 4 ||Mason (1-0)||Knepper (2-3)||Smith (12)|| 20,678 ||22-14||
|- align="center" bgcolor="bbffbb"
|37||May 19|| Reds||9 – 2 ||Sutcliffe (7-2)||Browning (4-5)||Lynch (3)|| 28,890 ||23-14||Harry Caray returns from stroke
|- align="center" bgcolor="ffbbbb"
|38||May 20|| Reds||6 – 2 ||Gullickson (5-2)||Maddux (3-3)|||| 27,150 ||23-15||
|- align="center" bgcolor="bbffbb"
|39||May 21|| Reds||8 – 7 ||Smith (1-2)||Franco (1-1)|||| 21,718 ||24-15||
|- align="center" bgcolor="ffbbbb"
|40||May 22|| Braves||9 – 5 ||Palmer (4-4)||Sanderson (3-1)||Acker (4)|| 28,667 ||24-16||
|- align="center" bgcolor="bbffbb"
|41||May 23|| Braves||7 – 6 16||Moyer (4-3)||Acker (0-3)|||| 33,225 ||25-16||Dawson homers with 2 outs in 9th to tie
|- align="center" bgcolor="bbffbb"
|42||May 24|| Braves||3 – 2 12||Noles (3-1)||Dedmon (2-1)|||| 37,259 ||26-16||
|- align="center" bgcolor="ffbbbb"
|43||May 25||@ Reds||5 – 4 ||Gullickson (6-2)||Maddux (3-4)||Franco (8)|| 24,684 ||26-17||
|- align="center" bgcolor="ffbbbb"
|44||May 26||@ Reds||3 – 2 ||Franco (2-1)||Smith (1-3)|||| 21,388 ||26-18||
|- align="center" bgcolor="bbffbb"
|45||May 27||@ Reds||4 – 1 ||Moyer (5-3)||Reuss (0-3)||Smith (13)|| 23,304 ||27-18||
|- align="center" bgcolor="ffbbbb"
|46||May 29||@ Braves||6 – 5 12||Garber (6-3)||Lynch (1-4)|||| 21,982 ||27-19||
|- align="center" bgcolor="bbffbb"
|47||May 30||@ Braves||11 – 6 ||Maddux (4-4)||Z. Smith (5-3)||Noles (2)|| 35,394 ||28-19||
|- align="center" bgcolor="ffbbbb"
|48||May 31||@ Braves||2 – 1 10||Garber (7-3)||Lynch (1-5)|||| 24,353 ||28-20||
|-

|- align="center" bgcolor="ffbbbb"
|49||June 1|| Astros||6 – 5 10||Andersen (4-2)||DiPino (1-1)||Smith (9)|| 14,556 ||28-21||
|- align="center" bgcolor="bbffbb"
|50||June 2|| Astros||13 – 2 ||Mason (2-0)||Ryan (2-5)|||| 13,891 ||29-21||
|- align="center" bgcolor="bbffbb"
|51||June 3|| Astros||22 – 7 ||Sutcliffe (8-2)||Knepper (2-6)|||| 19,725 ||30-21||
|- align="center" bgcolor="ffbbbb"
|52||June 4|| Cardinals||3 – 1 ||Cox (6-2)||Maddux (4-5)||Worrell (12)|| 32,102 ||30-22||
|- align="center" bgcolor="ffbbbb"
|53||June 5|| Cardinals||5 – 1 ||Mathews (3-4)||Sanderson (3-2)|||| 36,818 ||30-23||
|- align="center" bgcolor="bbffbb"
|54||June 6|| Cardinals||6 – 5 ||Moyer (6-3)||Forsch (4-2)||Smith (14)|| 39,008 ||31-23||
|- align="center" bgcolor="ffbbbb"
|55||June 7|| Cardinals||13 – 9 ||Dawley (2-4)||Mason (2-1)||Worrell (13)|| 38,388 ||31-24||
|- align="center" bgcolor="bbffbb"
|56||June 8|| Mets||4 – 2 ||Smith (2-3)||Sisk (1-1)|||| 28,063 ||32-24||
|- align="center" bgcolor="bbffbb"
|57||June 9|| Mets||6 – 5 ||Noles (4-1)||Myers (0-2)||Smith (15)|| 31,252 ||33-24||
|- align="center" bgcolor="ffbbbb"
|58||June 10|| Mets||13 – 2 ||Gooden (2-0)||Sanderson (3-3)|||| 35,190 ||33-25||
|- align="center" bgcolor="ffbbbb"
|59||June 12||@ Cardinals||4 – 1 ||Forsch (5-2)||Moyer (6-4)||Worrell (15)|| 48,096 ||33-26||
|- align="center" bgcolor="ffbbbb"
|60||June 13||@ Cardinals||9 – 2 ||Tunnell (3-1)||Sutcliffe (8-3)|||| 47,395 ||33-27||
|- align="center" bgcolor="ffbbbb"
|61||June 14||@ Cardinals||3 – 2 ||Cox (7-3)||Sanderson (3-4)||Worrell (16)|| 46,106 ||33-28||
|- align="center" bgcolor="ffbbbb"
|62||June 15|| Phillies||3 – 2 ||Tekulve (2-2)||Smith (2-4)||Bedrosian (16)|| 18,643 ||33-29||
|- align="center" bgcolor="bbffbb"
|63||June 16|| Phillies||7 – 2 ||Trout (3-1)||K. Gross (4-6)||Smith (16)|| 30,007 ||34-29||
|- align="center" bgcolor="bbffbb"
|64||June 17|| Phillies||5 – 3 ||Moyer (7-4)||Rawley (7-4)||Smith (17)|| 26,447 ||35-29||
|- align="center" bgcolor="bbffbb"
|65||June 18|| Phillies||9 – 7 ||Sutcliffe (9-3)||M. Jackson (1-5)||Smith (18)|| 22,870 ||36-29||
|- align="center" bgcolor="ffbbbb"
|66||June 19|| Pirates||4 – 0 ||Fisher (3-4)||Noles (4-2)|||| 33,529 ||36-30||
|- align="center" bgcolor="ffbbbb"
|67||June 20|| Pirates||8 – 2 ||Dunne (3-1)||Maddux (4-6)|||| 34,384 ||36-31||
|- align="center" bgcolor="bbffbb"
|68||June 21|| Pirates||6 – 3 ||Trout (4-1)||Drabek (1-6)||Smith (19)|| 33,418 ||37-31||
|- align="center" bgcolor="bbffbb"
|69||June 22|| Pirates||3 – 2 ||Moyer (8-4)||Reuschel (5-4)|||| 27,064 ||38-31||
|- align="center" bgcolor="bbffbb"
|70||June 23||@ Mets||4 – 1 ||Sutcliffe (10-3)||Darling (2-5)||Smith (20)|| 39,789 ||39-31||
|- align="center" bgcolor="ffbbbb"
|71||June 24||@ Mets||2 – 1 ||McDowell (4-2)||Smith (2-5)|||| 42,196 ||39-32||
|- align="center" bgcolor="ffbbbb"
|72||June 25||@ Mets||8 – 2 ||Gooden (4-1)||Trout (4-2)|||| 40,167 ||39-33||
|- align="center" bgcolor="ffbbbb"
|73||June 26||@ Pirates||5 – 2 ||Jones (1-1)||Maddux (4-7)||D. Robinson (10)|| 20,408 ||39-34||
|- align="center" bgcolor="ffbbbb"
|74||June 27||@ Pirates||7 – 0 ||Reuschel (6-4)||Moyer (8-5)|||| 31,595 ||39-35||
|- align="center" bgcolor="ffbbbb"
|75||June 28||@ Pirates||6 – 2 ||Jones (2-1)||Sutcliffe (10-4)|||| 25,304 ||39-36||
|- align="center" bgcolor="bbffbb"
|76||June 29||@ Expos||9 – 5 ||Lancaster (1-0)||Sorensen (3-4)||Lynch (4)|| 15,117 ||40-36||
|- align="center" bgcolor="ffbbbb"
|77||June 30||@ Expos||5 – 4 ||Martinez (3-0)||Trout (4-3)||Parrett (2)|| 13,777 ||40-37||
|-

|- align="center" bgcolor="bbffbb"
|78||July 1||@ Expos||1 – 0 ||Maddux (5-7)||Sebra (4-9)|||| 15,740 ||41-37||
|- align="center" bgcolor="ffbbbb"
|79||July 3|| Giants||3 – 1 ||Downs (7-4)||Moyer (8-6)||J. Robinson (9)|| 37,650 ||41-38||
|- align="center" bgcolor="bbffbb"
|80||July 4|| Giants||5 – 3 ||Sutcliffe (11-4)||Hammaker (4-6)||Smith (21)|| 30,929 ||42-38||
|- align="center" bgcolor="ffbbbb"
|81||July 5|| Giants||7 – 5 ||Price (1-0)||Lynch (1-6)||Garrelts (10)|| 32,304 ||42-39||
|- align="center" bgcolor="bbffbb"
|82||July 6|| Padres||7 – 0 ||Trout (5-3)||Grant (1-3)|||| 20,508 ||43-39||
|- align="center" bgcolor="bbffbb"
|83||July 7|| Padres||7 – 5 ||Sanderson (4-4)||Show (4-10)||Smith (22)|| 26,615 ||44-39||Show beans Dawson
|- align="center" bgcolor="bbffbb"
|84||July 8|| Padres||12 – 8 ||Lancaster (2-0)||McCullers (4-6)|||| 31,278 ||45-39||
|- align="center" bgcolor="bbffbb"
|85||July 9|| Dodgers||12 – 5 ||Sutcliffe (12-4)||Honeycutt (2-9)||Sanderson (1)|| 33,606 ||46-39||
|- align="center" bgcolor="ffbbbb"
|86||July 10|| Dodgers||5 – 4 10||Young (4-5)||Smith (2-6)|||| 36,003 ||46-40||
|- align="center" bgcolor="bbffbb"
|87||July 11|| Dodgers||7 – 0 ||Trout (6-3)||Leary (1-5)|||| 37,045 ||47-40||
|- align="center" bgcolor="ffbbbb"
|88||July 12|| Dodgers||12 – 0 ||Welch (9-5)||Lancaster (2-1)|||| 35,895 ||47-41||
|- align="center" bgcolor="bbffbb"
|89||July 16||@ Giants||4 – 1 ||Moyer (9-6)||Dravecky (4-8)||Sanderson (2)|| 14,024 ||48-41||
|- align="center" bgcolor="bbffbb"
|90||July 17||@ Giants||5 – 1 ||Sutcliffe (13-4)||Downs (8-5)||Smith (23)|| 13,868 ||49-41||
|- align="center" bgcolor="ffbbbb"
|91||July 18||@ Giants||9 – 2 ||Hammaker (5-7)||Maddux (5-8)|||| 26,504 ||49-42||
|- align="center" bgcolor="ffbbbb"
|92||July 19||@ Giants||4 – 3 ||Garrelts (7-6)||Sanderson (4-5)|||| 35,865 ||49-43||
|- align="center" bgcolor="ffbbbb"
|93||July 20||@ Padres||7 – 4 ||McCullers (6-6)||Tewksbury (0-1)||M. Davis (2)|| 15,113 ||49-44||
|- align="center" bgcolor="ffbbbb"
|94||July 21||@ Padres||4 – 3 ||M. Davis (5-5)||Moyer (9-7)|||| 17,305 ||49-45||
|- align="center" bgcolor="bbffbb"
|95||July 22||@ Padres||6 – 3 ||Sutcliffe (14-4)||Grant (2-5)|||| 18,614 ||50-45||
|- align="center" bgcolor="bbffbb"
|96||July 24||@ Dodgers||6 – 4 ||Maddux (6-8)||Leary (1-6)||Smith (24)|| 38,052 ||51-45||
|- align="center" bgcolor="ffbbbb"
|97||July 25||@ Dodgers||7 – 2 ||Howell (3-3)||Tewksbury (0-2)||Pena (2)|| 32,143 ||51-46||
|- align="center" bgcolor="ffbbbb"
|98||July 26||@ Dodgers||7 – 6 ||Holton (3-1)||DiPino (1-2)||Young (8)|| 40,523 ||51-47||
|- align="center" bgcolor="bbffbb"
|99||July 28|| Expos||8 – 3 ||Sutcliffe (15-4)||McGaffigan (2-2)||Smith (25)|| 35,299 ||52-47||
|- align="center" bgcolor="ffbbbb"
|100||July 29|| Expos||11 – 3 ||Smith (7-4)||Maddux (6-9)|||| 37,019 ||52-48||
|- align="center" bgcolor="ffbbbb"
|101||July 30|| Expos||6 – 1 ||Heaton (12-4)||Tewksbury (0-3)|||| 28,128 ||52-49||
|- align="center" bgcolor="ffbbbb"
|102||July 31|| Phillies||8 – 5 ||Tekulve (5-3)||Sanderson (4-6)||Bedrosian (30)|| 32,930 ||52-50||
|-

|- align="center" bgcolor="bbffbb"
|103||August 1|| Phillies||5 – 3 ||Lancaster (3-1)||Hume (1-3)||Smith (26)|| 33,002 ||53-50||Dawson hits three home runs
|- align="center" bgcolor="bbffbb"
|104||August 2|| Phillies||3 – 2 10||Smith (3-6)||Calhoun (0-1)|||| 33,629 ||54-50||
|- align="center" bgcolor="ffbbbb"
|105||August 3||@ Pirates||6 – 4 ||Drabek (3-10)||Maddux (6-10)||Gott (1)|| 7,281 ||54-51||
|- align="center" bgcolor="bbffbb"
|106||August 4||@ Pirates||3 – 2 11||Mason (3-1)||Gideon (1-2)|||| 8,744 ||55-51||
|- align="center" bgcolor="ffbbbb"
|107||August 5||@ Pirates||10 – 0 ||Fisher (7-6)||Moyer (9-8)|||| 7,726 ||55-52||
|- align="center" bgcolor="ffbbbb"
|108||August 6||@ Mets||7 – 6 ||McDowell (7-3)||Smith (3-7)|||| 37,584 ||55-53||
|- align="center" bgcolor="ffbbbb"
|109||August 7||@ Mets||7 – 1 ||Darling (8-7)||Sutcliffe (15-5)|||| 43,440 ||55-54||
|- align="center" bgcolor="bbffbb"
|110||August 8||@ Mets||5 – 3 ||Mason (4-1)||Schulze (1-2)||Smith (27)|| 47,893 ||56-54||
|- align="center" bgcolor="bbffbb"
|111||August 9||@ Mets||6 – 3 ||Sanderson (5-6)||Gooden (9-4)||Smith (28)|| 49,031 ||57-54||
|- align="center" bgcolor="ffbbbb"
|112||August 10||@ Phillies||4 – 2 ||Frohwirth (1-0)||Moyer (9-9)||Bedrosian (31)|| 26,796 ||57-55||
|- align="center" bgcolor="ffbbbb"
|113||August 11||@ Phillies||9 – 8 13||K. Gross (7-10)||Tewksbury (0-4)|||| 30,459 ||57-56||
|- align="center" bgcolor="ffbbbb"
|114||August 12||@ Phillies||13 – 7 ||Calhoun (1-1)||Lynch (1-7)|||| 36,190 ||57-57||
|- align="center" bgcolor="bbffbb"
|115||August 13|| Mets||7 – 5 ||DiPino (2-2)||McDowell (7-4)||Smith (29)|| 35,033 ||58-57||
|- align="center" bgcolor="bbffbb"
|116||August 14|| Mets||6 – 1 ||Sanderson (6-6)||Mitchell (3-5)|||| 17,811 ||59-57||
|- align="center" bgcolor="bbffbb"
|117||August 15|| Mets||7 – 3 ||Moyer (10-9)||Leach (10-1)||DiPino (2)|| 32,425 ||60-57||
|- align="center" bgcolor="ffbbbb"
|118||August 16|| Mets||23 – 10 ||Darling (10-7)||Maddux (6-11)|||| 32,731 ||60-58||Billy Williams day ruined by football score
|- align="center" bgcolor="ffbbbb"
|119||August 18||@ Braves||9 – 5 ||Mahler (7-12)||Lynch (1-8)||Acker (8)|| 17,469 ||60-59||
|- align="center" bgcolor="bbffbb"
|120||August 19||@ Braves||9 – 1 ||Sanderson (7-6)||Puleo (5-6)|||| 10,523 ||61-59||
|- align="center" bgcolor="ffbbbb"
|121||August 20||@ Braves||13 – 4 ||Acker (1-5)||Moyer (10-10)|||| 11,647 ||61-60||
|- align="center" bgcolor="bbffbb"
|122||August 21|| Astros||7 – 5 ||DiPino (3-2)||Deshaies (10-5)||Smith (30)|| 31,006 ||62-60||
|- align="center" bgcolor="ffbbbb"
|123||August 22|| Astros||5 – 4 11||Andersen (8-4)||DiPino (3-3)||Smith (21)|| 32,552 ||62-61||
|- align="center" bgcolor="ffbbbb"
|124||August 23|| Astros||4 – 2 ||Heathcock (3-1)||Sutcliffe (15-6)||Smith (22)|| 33,934 ||62-62||
|- align="center" bgcolor="ffbbbb"
|125||August 27|| Braves||5 – 2 ||Z. Smith (14-7)||Moyer (10-11)||||||62-63||
|- align="center" bgcolor="bbffbb"
|126||August 27|| Braves||8 – 6 8||Lancaster (4-1)||Mahler (7-13)||DiPino (3)|| 19,006 ||63-63||
|- align="center" bgcolor="bbffbb"
|127||August 28||@ Reds||6 – 5 10||Smith (4-7)||Franco (7-5)|||| 28,223 ||64-63||
|- align="center" bgcolor="ffbbbb"
|128||August 29||@ Reds||4 – 1 ||Browning (6-11)||Sanderson (7-7)|||| 37,783 ||64-64||
|- align="center" bgcolor="bbffbb"
|129||August 30||@ Reds||3 – 1 ||Lynch (2-8)||Rasmussen (0-1)||Smith (31)|| 33,485 ||65-64||
|- align="center" bgcolor="bbffbb"
|130||August 31||@ Astros||4 – 3 ||Lancaster (5-1)||Darwin (8-9)||Smith (32)|| 17,734 ||66-64||
|-

|- align="center" bgcolor="bbffbb"
|131||September 1||@ Astros||3 – 2 ||Moyer (11-11)||Hernandez (0-1)||Smith (33)|| 14,026 ||67-64||
|- align="center" bgcolor="ffbbbb"
|132||September 2||@ Astros||10 – 1 ||Scott (14-10)||Sutcliffe (15-7)|||| 17,406 ||67-65||
|- align="center" bgcolor="ffbbbb"
|133||September 4|| Reds||4 – 3 ||Williams (4-0)||Smith (4-8)||Franco (26)|| 19,715 ||67-66||
|- align="center" bgcolor="ffbbbb"
|134||September 5|| Reds||10 – 5 ||Rasmussen (1-1)||Lynch (2-9)|||| 33,336 ||67-67||
|- align="center" bgcolor="bbffbb"
|135||September 6|| Reds||3 – 1 ||Lancaster (6-1)||Power (10-10)||Smith (34)|| 33,093 ||68-67||
|- align="center" bgcolor="ffbbbb"
|136||September 7|| Pirates||3 – 2 ||Fisher (8-9)||Moyer (11-12)||J. Robinson (11)|| 21,745 ||68-68||
|- align="center" bgcolor="ffbbbb"
|137||September 8|| Pirates||4 – 1 ||Palacios (1-0)||Sutcliffe (15-8)||Gott (8)|| 8,331 ||68-69||
|- align="center" bgcolor="ffbbbb"
|138||September 9|| Pirates||4 – 3 ||J. Robinson (8-8)||Smith (4-9)||Gott (9)|| 8,054 ||68-70||
|- align="center" bgcolor="bbffbb"
|139||September 11|| Expos||8 – 4 ||Lancaster (7-1)||Youmans (9-8)|||| 10,174 ||69-70||
|- align="center" bgcolor="ffbbbb"
|140||September 12|| Expos||7 – 1 ||Perez (3-0)||Moyer (11-13)|||| 25,681 ||69-71||
|- align="center" bgcolor="bbffbb"
|141||September 13|| Expos||5 – 2 ||Sutcliffe (16-8)||Smith (9-7)|||| 25,444 ||70-71||
|- align="center" bgcolor="ffbbbb"
|142||September 14||@ Mets||6 – 5 ||Aguilera (9-2)||Hall (0-1)||Orosco (15)|| 27,693 ||70-72||
|- align="center" bgcolor="ffbbbb"
|143||September 15||@ Mets||12 – 4 ||Fernandez (11-8)||Maddux (6-12)|||| 31,806 ||70-73||
|- align="center" bgcolor="ffbbbb"
|144||September 16||@ Phillies||8 – 5 ||Maddux (2-0)||Smith (4-10)||Bedrosian (37)|| 17,598 ||70-74||
|- align="center" bgcolor="ffbbbb"
|145||September 17||@ Phillies||4 – 3 ||Carman (11-10)||Moyer (11-14)||Bedrosian (38)|| 10,338 ||70-75||
|- align="center" bgcolor="bbffbb"
|146||September 18||@ Cardinals||8 – 1 ||Sutcliffe (17-8)||Cox (9-8)|||| 44,189 ||71-75||
|- align="center" bgcolor="ffbbbb"
|147||September 19||@ Cardinals||5 – 3 ||Magrane (8-7)||Sanderson (7-8)||Worrell (30)|| 48,387 ||71-76||
|- align="center" bgcolor="ffbbbb"
|148||September 20||@ Cardinals||10 – 2 ||Forsch (11-5)||Maddux (6-13)|||| 44,894 ||71-77||
|- align="center" bgcolor="ffbbbb"
|149||September 21|| Mets||7 – 1 ||Gooden (15-6)||Lancaster (7-2)|||| 8,229 ||71-78||
|- align="center" bgcolor="bbffbb"
|150||September 22|| Mets||6 – 2 ||Sutcliffe (18-8)||Cone (5-5)|||| 11,672 ||72-78||
|- align="center" bgcolor="ffbbbb"
|151||September 23|| Phillies||5 – 0 ||Ruffin (11-14)||Moyer (11-15)|||| 7,160 ||72-79||
|- align="center" bgcolor="ffbbbb"
|152||September 24|| Phillies||3 – 2 11||Bedrosian (5-2)||Baller (0-1)|||| 6,904 ||72-80||
|- align="center" bgcolor="bbffbb"
|153||September 25|| Cardinals||2 – 1 ||Sanderson (8-8)||Forsch (11-6)||DiPino (4)|| 21,561 ||73-80||
|- align="center" bgcolor="ffbbbb"
|154||September 26|| Cardinals||5 – 3 ||Tudor (9-2)||Sutcliffe (18-9)||Dayley (4)|| 35,669 ||73-81||
|- align="center" bgcolor="bbffbb"
|155||September 27|| Cardinals||7 – 3 ||Lancaster (8-2)||Cox (10-9)||Smith (35)|| 33,912 ||74-81||
|- align="center" bgcolor="ffbbbb"
|156||September 30||@ Pirates||5 – 3 ||Fisher (11-9)||Sutcliffe (18-10)||J. Robinson (13)||||74-82||
|- align="center" bgcolor="bbffbb"
|157||September 30||@ Pirates||10 – 8 ||Hall (1-1)||Smiley (5-5)|||| 6,985 ||75-82||
|-

|- align="center" bgcolor="ffbbbb"
|158||October 1||@ Pirates||12 – 3 ||Drabek (11-12)||Sanderson (8-9)|||| 5,294 ||75-83||
|- align="center" bgcolor="ffbbbb"
|159||October 2||@ Expos||7 – 1 ||Heaton (13-10)||Maddux (6-14)||McGaffigan (12)|| 13,301 ||75-84||
|- align="center" bgcolor="ffbbbb"
|160||October 3||@ Expos||5 – 4 ||Parrett (7-5)||Lancaster (8-3)||Burke (18)|| 15,517 ||75-85||
|- align="center" bgcolor="bbffbb"
|161||October 4||@ Expos||7 – 5 ||Moyer (12-15)||Parrett (7-6)||Smith (36)|| 29,487 ||76-85||
|-

Player stats

Batting

Starters by position 
Note: Pos = Position; G = Games played; AB = At bats; H = Hits; Avg. = Batting average; HR = Home runs; RBI = Runs batted in

Other batters 
Note: G = Games played; AB = At bats; H = Hits; Avg. = Batting average; HR = Home runs; RBI = Runs batted in

Pitching

Starting pitchers 
Note: G = Games pitched; IP = Innings pitched; W = Wins; L = Losses; ERA = Earned run average; SO = Strikeouts

Other pitchers 
Note: G = Games pitched; IP = Innings pitched; W = Wins; L = Losses; ERA = Earned run average; SO = Strikeouts

Relief pitchers 
Note: G = Games pitched; W = Wins; L = Losses; SV = Saves; ERA = Earned run average; SO = Strikeouts

Awards and honors
 Andre Dawson – National League Most Valuable Player
 Andre Dawson – National League Leader Home Runs (49)
 Andre Dawson – National League Leader RBI (137)
 Andre Dawson, Outfield, Gold Glove Award
 Andre Dawson, Outfield, Silver Slugger Award
 Ryne Sandberg, Second Baseman, Gold Glove Award
 Rick Sutcliffe, Pitcher, Lou Gehrig Award
 Rick Sutcliffe, Roberto Clemente Award

All-Star Game

Farm system

References

External links
1987 Chicago Cubs at Baseball Reference
1987 Cubs on a Chicago-centric wiki
1987 Chicago Cubs on Baseball Almanac
List of guest announcers for Harry Caray

Chicago Cubs seasons
Chicago Cubs season
Chicago